Wisk'achani (Aymara wisk'acha a rodent, -ni a suffix to indicate ownership, "the one with the viscacha", Hispanicized spelling Viscachani) is a mountain in the Cordillera Real in the Bolivian Andes, about  high. It is located in the La Paz Department, Murillo Province, La Paz Municipality. Wisk'achani is situated north-west of the mountain Llamp'u. The lake Wisk'achani (Viscachani) lies at its feet, south-west of it.

References 

Mountains of La Paz Department (Bolivia)